Splicing factor 3B subunit 5 is a protein that in humans is encoded by the SF3B5 gene.

References

Further reading